Luis "Lou" Salvador Sr. (July 7, 1905 – March 1, 1973) was a Filipino basketball player, stage actor, and talent manager.  Salvador was born in Tacloban, Leyte, to a Spanish father and a mestiza mother.

As a player for the Philippine national basketball team during the 1923 Far Eastern Games, he scored 116 points in a single game, being one of the few basketball players to have scored over 100 points in a single game. He later became a leading figure in Philippine show business as a talent manager and a stage show impresario.

Several among his 124 children became notable personalities in the Philippine entertainment scene, beginning with his son Lou Salvador Jr., who was dubbed "The James Dean of the Philippines".

Basketball career
Salvador first played for the Philippine men's national basketball team at the age of seventeen, in the 1921 Far Eastern Games held in Shanghai. He also represented the Philippines in the 1923 and the 1925 Far Eastern Games, where his team in both instances won the gold medal. Salvador also played collegiate basketball for the Jose Rizal College Heavy Bombers, leading them to a national championship in 1924.

116 point career high game
Salvador's most notable basketball achievement came in May, 1923, during the Far Eastern Games in Osaka, Japan when he scored 116 points during a match against China. With this feat, he became one of only few basketball players to have scored over 100 points in a single game. Salvador would later attribute his achievement to excellent conditioning, recounting that for a whole year prior to that game, he had practiced daily at the YMCA compound in Manila, using a medicine ball which he would throw repeatedly to acclimatize his body. He confessed to finding ease at his achievement during the game itself, owing to his daily practice routine.

Bodabil and film career
Beginning in 1925, Salvador would make appearances in the Manila bodabil (vaudeville) stage under the name Chipipoy, and also as Van Ludor . His sister Miami was also a bodabil performer.

It was after World War II that Salvador attained the most influence in the Philippine entertainment scene. He became the most successful stage show impresario in the Philippines, organizing bodabil troupes that toured the country. Dubbed as "The Master Showman", he was credited with discovering and fostering the careers of such noted singers and comedians as Chiquito, Bentot, Cachupoy, Canuplin, Pepe Pimentel, Diomedes Maturan, and Eddie Peregrina.

Salvador also dabbled in films and established his own production company, Master Films. He was a featured cast member of Manuel Conde's Genghis Khan (1950), which was entered into competition in the Venice Film Festival in 1952. Salvador also directed the feature films Bad Boy (1957) and Barkada (1958), which both starred his son, Lou Salvador Jr.

The Lou Salvador Sr. Memorial Award is handed out by the Filipino Academy of Movie Arts and Sciences in his honor.

Personal life
Salvador fathered 102 children and reputedly had 48 women.

Apart from Lou Salvador Jr., he also fathered the actors Alona Alegre, Leroy Salvador (director, producer and politician), the eldest of the Salvador siblings, Mina Aragon, Phillip Salvador, Ross Rival, Emil Salvador, and Jumbo Salvador. Jobelle Salvador and Deborah Sun (daughters of Leroy Salvador), Ethan Salvador (son of Emil Salvador), Joshua Aquino (son of Phillip Salvador and Kris Aquino), and Maja Salvador (daughter of Ross Rival) are his grandchildren. Analain Salvador and Ashton Salvador (grandchildren of Alona Alegre) are his great grandchildren. Singer Juan Miguel Salvador (father of actress Janella Salvador) is the grandson of Lou Salvador's brother Pedro Salvador.

See also
 List of basketball players who have scored 100 points in a single game

Notes

References

External links
 

1905 births
1973 deaths
People from Tacloban
Basketball players from Leyte (province)
Male actors from Leyte (province)
Filipino film producers
Filipino men's basketball players
Filipino people of German descent
Filipino people of Spanish descent
20th-century Filipino male actors
Lou
Visayan people
JRU Heavy Bombers basketball players